Mallala may refer to:
District Council of Mallala, the former name of the Adelaide Plains Council, a local government area in South Australia
Mallala, South Australia, a town on the northern Adelaide Plains
Mallala Motor Sport Park, a motor racing circuit north of the town
RAAF Base Mallala, the previous use of the site of the racing circuit
Elfin Mallala, a sports racing car built in Australia

See also
 Malala (disambiguation)